North Cornelly is a village in Cornelly, Bridgend county borough, Wales. The village is close to South Cornelly, adjoins Pyle and Porthcawl, and junction 37 of the M4 motorway, which runs along its southern side.

The village is accessible from the motorway, the A4229 and the A48. There are regular buses to Porthcawl, Bridgend and Port Talbot. The nearest railway station is Pyle.

North Cornelly is first recorded as 'The Vill of Walter Lupellus' in a 12th-century document. The name North Cornelly probably derived from its close proximity to the crossroads where the road to the original village of Cornelly (present-day South Cornelly) branched off from the main road.

References

External links
 http://www.kenfig.org.uk/northcornelly.html

Villages in Bridgend County Borough